Town with Nicholas Crane is a BBC documentary series produced by Tern TV and first broadcast on BBC Two from 28 July 2011 to 11 June 2013. It covers various subjects about the history and development of towns in the United Kingdom. The series is presented by geographer Nicholas Crane. 

Each four-part series covers one town per hour-long episode, and documents the benefits of life in a town as compared with a larger city.

Episodes

Series 1

Series 2

References

External links
 

2011 British television series debuts
2013 British television series endings
2010s British documentary television series
BBC high definition shows
BBC television documentaries
English-language television shows
Television series about the United Kingdom